Des journées entières dans les arbres (in English, Entire Days in the Trees) is a 1976 French film directed by Marguerite Duras, based on her novel. Prior to directing a film version of the novel, Duras had already modified it into a stageplay that had enjoyed a theatrical run.

External links
 

1976 films
French drama films
1976 drama films
Films based on works by Marguerite Duras
Films directed by Marguerite Duras
1970s French-language films
1970s French films